Chacaltaya (Mollo language for "bridge of winds" or "winds meeting point", Aymara for "cold road") is a mountain in the Cordillera Real, one of the mountain ranges of the Cordillera Oriental, itself a range of the Bolivian Andes. Half of the meltdown, as measured by volume, took place before 1980. The final meltdown after 1980, due to missing precipitation and the warm phase of El Niño, resulted in the glacier's disappearance in 2009.

Ski area

The glacier on Chacaltaya served as Bolivia's only ski resort. It was the world's highest lift-served ski area and the northernmost in South America. The rope tow, the very first in South America, was built in 1939 using an automobile engine; it was housed in the site's original clapboard lodge, and is now inoperable. The road to the base of the  drop is reached by a narrow road, also built in the 1930s. Traditionally, due to the extreme cold weather, the lift operated exclusively on weekends from November to March. Since 2009, skiing is restricted to a  stretch that sometimes receives sufficient snowfall for a run during the winter. The mountain is also popular with amateur mountaineers, as the road stops only  from the summit. Guinness World Records considers the ski resort restaurant to be the highest restaurant in the world.

Retreat of Chacaltaya glacier

Scientists at the Mount Chacaltaya Laboratory started measuring the Chacaltaya glacier in the 1990s. Predicted at that time to survive until 2015, the glacier melted at a faster rate than expected. By 2009, it had been reduced to a few small patches of ice and snow near the top of the mountain.

Many Bolivians on the Altiplano and in two of Bolivia's main cities — La Paz and El Alto — depend on melt water from Andean glaciers for part of their water supply during the dry season. The World Bank has warned that many glaciers in the tropical portion of the Andes are expected to disappear within 20 years. This will threaten the water supplies of nearly 80 million people as well as the future generation of hydropower. Bolivia, Ecuador, and Peru depend on hydropower for about half their electricity.

Observatory

It is an important site for gamma ray research  and was the site in the 1940s of the first observations of pions.

The Chacaltaya (Astrophysical) Observatory belongs to the Universidad Mayor de San Andrés and it is operated in collaboration with other universities worldwide. It hosts a cosmic ray research group, and since 2011 the Chacaltaya Global Atmosphere Watch (GAW) station. The GAW station is one of the few monitoring sites of Essential Climate Variables (meteorological variables, aerosols, and greenhouse gases) in the Southern Hemisphere.

Climate

See also
List of highest astronomical observatories
Retreat of glaciers since 1850

References

External links

GAW station
Chacaltaya Glass Chamber Pyramid of the High Altitude Pathology Institute (Clinica IPPA)
Apex 3 medical research expedition
Chacaltaya Cosmic Rays observatory

Glaciers of Bolivia
Ski areas and resorts in Bolivia
Astronomical observatories in Bolivia
Mountains of La Paz Department (Bolivia)
Tourist attractions in La Paz Department (Bolivia)
Five-thousanders of the Andes